Cisco (formerly, Heaton Station) is an unincorporated community in Placer County, California. It lies at an elevation of 5938 feet (1810 m).

The Cisco post office operated from 1866 to 1941. The name Cisco honors John J. Cisco, treasurer of the Central Pacific Railroad.

The folk singer and songwriter Cisco Houston, who later befriended and toured extensively with Woody Guthrie, derived his nickname from Cisco, California.

Cisco, California was the fictional location of the opening and end of the movie Vanishing Point (1971).  The actual filming location was in Cisco, Utah.

Very little is left of Cisco today, and it has no actual population. Most Cisco residents have moved to the nearby locales of Cisco Grove and Kingvale.

Climate
This region experiences warm (but not hot) and dry summers, with no average monthly temperatures above 71.6 °F.  According to the Köppen Climate Classification system, Cisco has a warm-summer Mediterranean climate.

References

External links

Unincorporated communities in California
Unincorporated communities in Placer County, California